A tilted updraft (also known as a tilted storm) is a thunderstorm which is not vertically erect.  This happens as a result of unidirectional wind shear, or a change in wind speed with height. In such an environment, the top of the updraft is pushed further downstream than the lower parts as a result of stronger winds pushing the top, as it is higher in the atmosphere. Storms that occur in environments with wind shear are more likely to be severe.

References

Severe weather and convection

fr:Technique de Lemon#Technique